Mariangela Giordano (2 September 1937 – 16 July 2011) was an Italian film and television actress.

Life and career 
Born in Dolcedo, Imperia, Italy as Maria Angela Giordano, the daughter of a journalist, Giordano was elected Miss Liguria in 1954. Then she almost immediately started an intense film career, mainly appearing in genre films in which she was sometimes credited as Mary Jordan. She is known to cult horror movie fans for her starring roles in Giallo in Venice, Patrick Lives Again, The Devil's Daughter, Satan's Baby Doll, Burial Ground and Killer Barbys.

Since the 1980s, Giordano focused her career on television, appearing in the TV series Skipper and I ragazzi del muretto, among others. She died in Dolcedo on 16 July 2011.

Selected filmography 

 Il falco d'oro (1955) - Seconda domestica
 Cortile (1955) - The Girl asking Gargiulo for a Lift (uncredited)
 Dramma nel porto (1955)
 Da qui all'eredità (1955)
 La banda degli onesti (1956) - (uncredited)
 Il diavolo nero (1957)
 Desert Warrior (1957) - Aicha
 Mensajeros de paz (1957) - Marichu
 Buongiorno primo amore! (1957)
 Quando gli angeli piangono (1958)
 Cara de Goma (1959)
 Colossus and the Amazon Queen (1960) (a.k.a. Queen of the Amazons) - Amazzone
 Ursus (1961)
 Gli scontenti (1961)
 Black City (1961) - Ragazza che si finge incinta
 Romulus and the Sabines (1961)
 Ursus (1960) (a.k.a. Ursus, Son of Hercules) - Annia
 El reflejo del alma (1962)
 Canzoni a tempo di twist (1962)
 The Eye of the Needle (1963) - Carmelina Lo Niro
 The Last Gun (1964)
 Sette a Tebe (1964) - Serva di Cirene
 A Maiden for a Prince (1965) - La marchesa spagnola
 Te lo leggo negli occhi (1965)
 Djurado (1966) - Dorianne
 How I Learned to Love Women (1966) - Proprietaria stazione di servizio
 Vengeance (1968) - Rosita
 Three Crosses Not to Die (1968) - Betty Fletcher
 I quattro del pater noster (1969)
 A Noose for Django (1969) - Dolores Roja
 The Reward's Yours... The Man's Mine (1969) - Babe
 The Legacy of Caine (1971)
 Decameron n° 2 - Le altre novelle del Boccaccio (1972) - Ferondo's wife
 Decameron n° 4 - Le belle novelle del Boccaccio (1972) - Tessa
 The Lusty Wives of Canterbury (1972)
 Quant'è bella la Bernarda, tutta nera, tutta calda (1975) - Eleonora (segment "Eleonora e Sigismondo")
 L'altro Dio (1975) - Adriana
 Don Milani (1976) - Donna
 Il colpaccio (1976) - Amante di Sandro
 Che dottoressa ragazzi! (1976) - Rosalia
 The Last Round (1976) - Lisa's mother
 Batton Story (1976) - Priscilla - mother of Stefano
 Un giorno alla fine di ottobre (1977) - La segretaria di Lorenzo
 Dove volano i corvi d'argento (1977) - Basilia
 Moglie nuda e siciliana (1978) - Bianca
 Il commissario di ferro (1978) - Signora Parolini
 Malabimba – The Malicious Whore (1979) - Suor Sofia
 Giallo a Venezia (1979) (a.k.a. Giallo in Venice) - Stella Randolph
 Patrick Is Still Alive (1980) (a.k.a. Patrick Lives Again)
 Burial Ground (1981) (a.k.a. Nights of Terror) - Evelyn
 Paula Mujer de la Noche (1981)
 Eroticón (1981) - Zulma Santana
 Satan's Baby Doll (1982) (a.k.a. La Bimba di Satana) - Sol
 Il motorino (1984)
 Noi uomini duri (1987) - Teresa
 Io e mia sorella (1987) - Nadia
 Il volpone (1988) - Eliana Voltore
 Captain Fracassa's Journey (1990)
 Stasera a casa di Alice (1990) - Medium
 The Devil's Daughter (1991) (a.k.a. La Secta/ The Sect) - Kathryn
 Abbronzatissimi (1991) - Madre di Martina
 Women in Arms (1991) - Miss Locasciulli
 Ci hai rotto papà (1993) - Suor Giovanna
 Let's Not Keep in Touch (1994) - Amante in 'Galline da combattimento'
 Once a Year, Every Year (1994)
 Killer Barbys (1996, directed by Jesus Franco) - Condesa (Countess)
 Panarea (1997) - Signora Bedoni
 A luci spente (2004)
 Cuore sacro (2005)

References

External links 

1937 births
2011 deaths
Italian film actresses
Italian television actresses
People from the Province of Imperia